A Paris... is a studio album by jazz pianist and composer Jacky Terrasson recorded in France and released on 27 February 2000 by Blue Note label. This album is dedicated to the City of Lights—Paris—and all of France. The album contains a collection of jazz adaptations of the most famous French chanson tunes.

Reception
John Murph of JazzTimes wrote, "Recorded in France and featuring both French jazz artists and French compositions, you’d expect pianist-composer Jacky Terrasson’s homage to his hometown to be more exuberant. Instead, the wistful, lyrical A Paris sounds like a yearning mediation on the City of Lights rather than a celebration." David R. Adler of AllMusic commented, "Several rather short pieces are grouped right around the middle of the album, giving that part of the program a collage-like feel that can seem a bit superficial. That aside, Terrasson has pulled off something rare: a concept album that succeeds on a variety of creative levels. In the process, he's given exposure to several excellent European musicians, not to mention some beautiful French music that American audiences ought to hear." Vincenzo Martorella of PopMatters added, "With his beautiful, and singable, melodies, nice arrangements and very cool playing, A Paris stands as Terrasson's masterwork."

Track listing

Personnel
Jacky Terrasson – piano
Stefano di Battista – sax
Gregoire Maret – harmonica
Stefon Harris – marimba
Bireli Lagrene – guitar
Ugonna Okegwo – bass
Remi Vignolo – bass
Terreon Gully – drums
Leon Parker – drums, vocals (tracks: 14)
Minino Garay – percussion, vocals (tracks: 14)

Charts

References

2000 albums
Jacky Terrasson albums
Blue Note Records albums